

History 
IRS-P3 was a remote sensing satellite launched by ISRO on board of Polar Satellite Launch Vehicle (PSLV) launch vehicle for remote sensing of Earth's natural resources. It also hosted a scientific instrument, the Indian X-ray Astronomy Experiment (IXAE), for the study of X-ray astronomy. The IRS-P3 satellite contained an X-ray astronomy instrument, a C-band transponder and two remote sensing instruments. IRS-P3 was one of the satellite in the Indian Remote Sensing Programme of Earth observation satellites, assembled, launched and maintained by Indian Space Research Organisation. There was no data recording device on board of the IRS-P3 and data was transmitted in real-time to the ground stationd in Hyderabad, India and Neustrelitz, Germany.

Instruments 
IRS-P3 carried two remote sensing instruments and one X-ray astronomy experiment:

 Modular opto-electronic scanner (MOS), which was provided by German Aerospace Center (DLR), in the framework of a cooperative agreement between ISRO and DLR. MOS was designed for ocean remote sensing.

 Indian X-ray astronomy experiment (IXAE). IXAE was to study the time variability and spectral characteristics of cosmic X-ray sources and for detection of transient X-ray sources. The experiment was developed by ISRO Satellite Centre (URSC) and Tata Institute of Fundamental Research (TIFR). The experiment was intended to study periodic and aperiodic intensity variation in galactic/extragalactic X-ray, spectral characteristics of various sources and properties of newly discovered X-ray transients. IXAE instruments consisted of three identical pointed mode proportional counters (PPCs) operated in the energy range 2-20 keV, FOV of 2° x 2° and effective area of 1200 cm2, and an X-ray sky monitor (XSM) operating in the energy range 2-10 keV.

 Wide-field sensor (WiFS) with additional Short-Wave Infrared band (SWIR). The sensor was designed for vegetation dynamic studies.

Launch 
IRS-P3 was launched by the PSLV-D3 launch vehicle on 21 March 1996, at 04:53 UTC, from Satish Dhawan Space Centre, Sriharikota, India. Periodic calibration of Polar Satellite Launch Vehicle tracking radar was located at tracking stations.

Mission 
The mission was completed on 15 October 2004 after serving for 8.5 years. With the consecutive successful launches of the PSLV, it was decided not to plan any more Augmented Satellite Launch Vehicle (ASLV) missions.

See also 

 Indian Remote Sensing

References

External links 
 ISRO IRS-P3 link

Earth observation satellites of India
Spacecraft launched in 1996
1996 in India